KB Košice is a Slovak professional basketball club based in Košice. The team played in the Slovak Basketball League (SBL), the top-tier national basketball league. It played its home games at Angels Arena, which has a capacity of 2,500 people. After the 2017-18 season, the team resigned from participation in the SBL.

Honours
Slovak Basketball League
Runners-up (1): 2017–18
Slovak Basketball Cup
Winners (2): 2016–17, 2017–18

References

External links
Official website

Basketball teams in Slovakia
Sport in Košice
Basketball teams established in 1994
1994 establishments in Slovakia